There are a number of notable people from North Omaha, Nebraska. This list includes people who lived in the community for any period of time, as well as groups and organizations of people within North Omaha.

Political figures

 John Adams, Jr., first African American elected to the Nebraska Legislature after it became a unicameral, Nebraska State Senator
 Ernie Chambers, Nebraska State Senator, historical North Omaha community leader
 Brenda Council, city councilmember
 Lowen Kruse, Nebraska State Senator
 Malcolm X, civil rights leader
 George Wells Parker, founder of Hamitic League of the World
 John Grant Pegg, Weights and Measure Inspector, 1910-1916, Omaha
 Dr. Matthew Ricketts, first African American elected to the Nebraska Legislature, Nebraska State Senator
 Silas Robbins, first African American lawyer in Omaha
 Joe Rogers, Colorado Lieutenant Governor, 1999-2003 (Republican)
 Standing Bear, imprisoned and tried at Fort Omaha in Standing Bear v. Crook
 Susette LaFlesche Tibbles, Ponca member associated with the Standing Bear v. Crook trial
 Thomas Tibbles, journalist associated with the Standing Bear v. Crook trial
 Whitney Young, former head of Omaha Urban League
 Aaron Manasses McMillan, Nebraska State Senator, founder of the Peoples Hospital in North Omaha
Gladys Harrison, primary candidate for the U.S. House of Representatives

Stage, film, theater and dance figures
 John Beasley, television and film actor 
 Gabrielle Union, television and film actress

Literary figures
 Harold W. Andersen, Omaha World-Herald reporter
 Mildred D. Brown, founder of Omaha Star, the oldest and perhaps the only African American newspaper founded by a woman
 Tillie Olsen,  Jewish author
 Wallace Thurman,  considered one of the greatest writers of the Harlem Renaissance

Music figures
 Lester Abrams, funk musician
 Wynonie Harris, rhythm & blues singer
 Lloyd Hunter, big band leader
 Preston Love, jazz player
 Buddy Miles, musician
 Geneice Wilcher, beauty pageant winner
 Big Joe Williams, musician
 Anna Mae Winburn, big band leader
 Helen Jones Woods, big band trombonist

Business figures
 Mildred Brown, founder of Omaha Star newspaper
 Warren Buffett, business magnate, investor, and philanthropist
 Edward Creighton, pioneer businessman
 John A. Creighton, pioneer businessman, philanthropist
 Cathy Hughes, founder and president of Radio One
 Manuel Lisa, fur trapper, founder of Fort Lisa

Sports figures
 Houston Alexander, mixed martial arts fighter
 Bob Boozer, former National Basketball Association player and gold medalist at the 1960 Summer Olympics
 Terence Crawford, World Champion Boxer
 Bob Gibson, National Baseball Hall of Fame pitcher for St. Louis Cardinals 
 Ahman Green, professional football player
 Kenton Keith, professional football player
 Ron Prince, former head football coach at Kansas State University
 Johnny Rodgers, 1972 Heisman Trophy winner, College Football Hall of Fame Inductee, voted University of Nebraska's "player of the century" 
 Gale Sayers, professional football player, Pro Football Hall of Fame inductee

Military

 George Crook, leader of Fort Omaha
 Alfonza W. Davis, Captain in the Tuskegee Airmen; born 1918 in North Omaha, graduate of Technical High School (Omaha, Nebraska), graduate of Omaha University, member of Kappa Alpha Psi; first black military aviator from Omaha to receive his wings from Tuskegee Field; KIA over Germany in 1944
 Benjamin Foulois, stationed at Fort Omaha Balloon School
 Stuart Heintzelman, stationed at Fort Omaha
 Dan Christie Kingman, stationed at Fort Omaha
 Frank Purdy Lahm, stationed at Fort Omaha Balloon School
 Thomas Selfridge, stationed at Fort Omaha Balloon School

Cultural figures 
 Buffalo Bill, founded his Wild West Show in North Omaha
 Bertha Calloway, founded the Great Plains Black History Museum
 Thomas Rogers Kimball, early Omaha architect; designed Webster Telephone Exchange Building and several other significant buildings in North Omaha
 Rowena Moore, founder of the Malcolm X House Site
 Ken Vavrina, influential liberal activist priest in North Omaha
 Clarence W. Wigington,  first African American municipal architect in the U.S; raised and began his career in Omaha

Other
 Joe Coe, local worker lynched by white mob
 Jack Broomfield, locally significant community figure
 Willy Brown, local worker lynched by white mob

See also
List of people from Omaha, Nebraska
African Americans in Omaha, Nebraska

References

 
Dynamic lists
People from North Omaha
North Omaha